The 1978 Virginia Slims of Los Angeles  was a women's tennis tournament played on indoor carpet courts at the Memorial Sports Arena  in Los Angeles, California in the United States that was part of the 1978 Virginia Slims World Championship Series. It was the fifth edition of the tournament and was held from January 23 through January 29, 1978. Second-seeded Martina Navratilova won the singles title and earned $20,000 first-prize money.

Finals

Singles
 Martina Navratilova defeated  Rosie Casals 6–3, 6–2

Doubles
 Betty Stöve /  Virginia Wade defeated  Pam Teeguarden /  Greer Stevens 6–3, 6–2

Prize money

References

External links
 Women's Tennis Association (WTA) tournament details

Virginia Slims of Los Angeles
LA Women's Tennis Championships
Virginia Slims of Los Angeles
Virginia Slims of Los Angeles
Virginia Slims of Los Angeles
Virginia Slims of Los Angeles